A list of notable historians from Estonia:

A
Karin Aasma
Tiit Aleksejev

H
Vello Helk
Mart Helme
August Wilhelm Hupel

I
Magnus Ilmjärv
Richard Indreko

J
Ea Jansen
Peeter Järvelaid

K
Andres Kasekamp
Johan Kõpp

L
Mart Laar
Mati Laur
Otto Liiv
Tõnis Lukas

M
Linnart Mäll
Friedrich Fromhold Martens
Olaf Mertelsmann
Harri Moora

N
Mart Nutt

O
Sulev Oll

P
Helmut Piirimäe

R
Tiit Rosenberg

S
Edgar Valter Saks
Anti Selart
Leonid Stolovich

T
Sirje Tamul
Simmu Tiik

V
Lauri Vahtre
Sulev Vahtre
Heiki Valk
Arthur Võõbus

See also
List of Estonian archaeologists

 List of Estonian historians
Estonia
Historians